Cox is a commune in the Haute-Garonne department in southwestern France. It is about 40 km north west of Toulouse.

The name Cox is derived from the Occitan word 'Coth' meaning 'top of the hill'.

The village has a museum of pottery, housed in the former home of potter Joseph Laballe (1886-1942).

Population

See also
Communes of the Haute-Garonne department

References

Communes of Haute-Garonne